Pingasa grandidieri is a moth of the family Geometridae first described by Arthur Gardiner Butler in 1879. It is found on Madagascar.

References

Moths described in 1879
Pseudoterpnini
Moths of Madagascar
Moths of Africa